Dissonanze was a yearly festival focused on electronic music held in Rome, Italy. The first edition was in 2000. Besides music it also focuses on multimedia & video art. The festival takes place at the Palazzo dei Congressi in Rome.

Dissonanze 6
T. Raumschmiere, a.o..

Dissonanze 8
 Caribou, No Age, Yacht, a.o..

Dissonanze 9
8th and 9 May 2009. 
Micachu, Timo Maas, Telepathe, A Critical Mass, a.o.

See also

List of electronic music festivals

External links
www.dissonanze.it
Dissonanze 6

Music festivals established in 2000
Electronic music festivals in Italy
Festivals in Rome